Richard Smith (fl. 1584) was an English politician.

He was a Member (MP) of the Parliament of England for Cricklade in 1584.

References

Year of birth missing
Year of death missing
English MPs 1584–1585
Members of Parliament for Cricklade